Karonge may refer to:
Karonge, Bubanza, Burundi
Karonge, Rugazi, Burundi